Swinside, which is also known as Sunkenkirk and Swineshead, is a stone circle lying beside Swinside Fell, part of Black Combe in southern Cumbria, North West England. One of around 1,300 recorded stone circles in the British Isles and Brittany, it was constructed as a part of a megalithic tradition that lasted from 3,300 to 900 BC, during what archaeologists categorise as the Late Neolithic and Early Bronze Ages.

In this period, the Lake District – a mountainous area in which Swinside is located – saw particularly high levels of stone circle construction, with other notable examples including the Castlerigg stone circle and Long Meg and Her Daughters. The original purposes of these circles is still debated, although most archaeologists concur that they were built for ritual or ceremonial reasons. Constructed from local slate, the ring has a diameter of about 93 ft 8ins (26.8m), and currently contains 55 stones, although when originally constructed there probably would have been around 60. An entrance-exit was included on the monument's south-eastern side, which was defined by the inclusion of two outer portal stones.

In the Early Modern period, local folklore about the stones held that they had once been used in the construction of a church, but that the Devil continually thwarted these plans, creating the stone circle in the process. Archaeological investigation into the monument began in the early 20th century, with an excavation taking place in 1901.

Location 
The stone circle at Swinside is located in the south-west corner of the Lake District in the ancient district of Millom, 5 miles north of the town of Millom (map reference ) . There is no visitors centre or car park at the site, which can only be reached by travelling on foot. To reach the site, the visitor must get to Crag Hall, where there are limited places for parking, and then walk along a rough track for 2¼ km (1¼ miles) uphill towards Swinside Farm, where the megalithic ring lies to the right of the path.

Megalithic specialist Aubrey Burl called Swinside "the loveliest of all the circles" in north-western Europe. In his study of the stone circles of Cumbria, archaeologist John Waterhouse commented that Swinside "can be compared only to Castlerigg and Long Meg and her Daughters in its visual impact; but its charm – for great charm it undoubtedly has – is greater even than theirs."

Background 

During the Late Neolithic, British society underwent a series of major changes. Between 3500 and 3300 BC, prehistoric Britons ceased their continual expansion and cultivation of wilderness and instead focused on settling and farming the most agriculturally productive areas of the island: Orkney, eastern Scotland, Anglesey, the upper Thames, Wessex, Essex, Yorkshire and the river valleys of the Wash.

This period was also signalled by what archaeologists have interpreted as a change in religious beliefs across Britain. Communities stopped building the large chambered tombs for the dead, and instead, they began the construction of large wooden and stone circles. The prominent megalithic-specialist and archaeologist Aubrey Burl (2000) argued that the change from building tombs to building open air rings signalled a change in religious belief for the peoples of north-western Europe. As he noted; "There was a change from the cramped, gloomy chamber or a tomb to the unroofed, wide ring, a change from darkness to light, from the dead to the living, from the grave to the sky."

Purpose 
Exactly for what purpose prehistoric Britons originally constructed stone circles is a question that continues to elude archaeologists. Despite this, many suggestions have been put forward, most of which argue that they were a form of a church.

Based on his study of those examples found at Orkney in northern Scotland, the archaeologist Colin Richards suggested that the stone and wooden circles built in Late Neolithic Britain might have represented the centre of the world, or axis mundi, for those who constructed them, an idea adopted by fellow archaeologist Aaron Watson as a possibility in his discussion of why Late Neolithic peoples constructed the great ring at Avebury in southern England.

Construction 

The stones used in the construction of Swinside were porphyritic slate collected from the adjacent fells, and are of the type that was known locally as 'grey cobbles' by the 20th century. The ring has a diameter of about 93 ft 8ins (26.8m), and currently contains 55 stones, although when originally constructed there probably would have been around 60.

Swinside's builders included a "well defined" entrance, 2.1 m (7 ft) wide, at the south-eastern side, which was signalled by the placing of two large portal stones outside the circumference of the circle. Such portal openings can also be found at other stone circles in the Lake District, such as Long Meg and Her Daughters. These features are also found in stone circles in Dumfriesshire. In particular, Swinside has a number of features in common with the Girdle Stanes.

Folklore 
Local folklore holds that at night, the Devil would pull down the stones of a church that was being constructed in the daytime, in the process creating the stone circle; it is for this reason that the site has also been called Sunkenkirk.

In the 1930s, it was recorded that there was a local belief that it was impossible to count all of the stones.

Antiquarian and archaeological investigation 
In 1901 the Cumberland & Westmorland Antiquarian & Archaeological Society sponsored the first archaeological excavation at Swinside. Under the direction of C. W. Dymond FSA and W. G. Collingwood, the dig lasted from midday on Tuesday 26 March 1901 through to the evening of the following day. Two crosstrenches were dug, each 18 inches (45 cm) wide, covering just over one-thirteenth of the interior of the site. The excavators reported finding a lump of charcoal and a piece of decayed bone as well as some modern coins in the turf layer.

See also 
Birkrigg stone circle, 12 miles to the southeast
Grey Croft stone circle, 12 miles to the northwest

References

Footnotes

Bibliography 
Academic books

 
 
 
 
 
 
 
 

Academic papers and articles

External links 

 Swinside stone circle at Megalithia.com.
 Images of and notes about Sunkenkirk at The Modern Antiquarian.

Stone circles in Cumbria
Hamlets in Cumbria
Borough of Copeland